The 2023 SAFF U-16 Championship will be the 8th edition of the SAFF U-17 Championship, an international football competition for men's under-17 national teams organized by South Asian Football Federation (SAFF). Bhutan will host the tournament. The seven teams from the region take part.

India is the defending champion. They have won previous season title by beating Nepal 7−0 on 31 August 2019.

Venue 
The venue of the tournament has not announced yet.

Participating teams

Players eligibility 
Players born on or after 1 January 2006 are eligible to compete in the tournament. Each team has to register a squad of minimum 16 players and maximum 23 players, minimum two of whom must be goalkeepers.

See also
2023 SAFF U-20 Championship

References 

2023
2023 in Asian football
SAFF